Darrin Milo Nelson (born January 2, 1959) is a former American football running back and return specialist in the National Football League (NFL) for the Minnesota Vikings and San Diego Chargers. He played college football at Stanford University.

Early years
Nelson attended Pius X High School. He accepted a football scholarship from Stanford University to play under head coach Bill Walsh.

In his first year, he was named the starter and became the first freshman running back in conference history to rush for more than 1,000 yards in a season. He registered 183 carries for 1,069 yards, 3 rushing touchdowns, 50 receptions for 524 yards and 3 receiving touchdowns.

As a sophomore, he posted 167 carries for 1,061 yards, 6 rushing touchdowns, 50 receptions for 446 yards and 4 receiving touchdowns.

In 1979, he was lost for the season with a hamstring injury. As a junior, he had 161 carries for 889 yards, 4 rushing touchdowns, 47 receptions for 552 yards and 4 receiving touchdowns.

As a senior, he collected 192 carries for 1,014 yards, 11 rushing touchdowns, 67 receptions for 846 yards and 5 receiving touchdowns.

Nelson was a dual threat as a rusher and receiver, becoming the first player in NCAA history to rush for more than 1,000 yards and catch more than 50 passes in one season. He accomplished this feat three times. He finished his college career with the school records for rushing yards (4,033), receptions (214), touchdowns (40), scoring (242 points), while also setting the  NCAA record with 6,885 career all-purpose yards.

He was inducted into the Stanford Athletic Hall of Fame. In 2014, he was inducted into the College Football Hall of Fame.

Professional career

Minnesota Vikings (first stint)
Nelson was selected by the Minnesota Vikings in the first round (7th overall) of the 1982 NFL Draft. As a rookie, he experienced a strike-shortened season that was reduced to 9 games, finishing second on the team to Ted Brown with 136 rushing yards.

As a running back, Nelson was a threat as both a runner and as receiver out of the backfield, though he is perhaps best known for dropping the game-tying touchdown on 4th down in the closing moments of the 1987 NFC Championship Game. In 1988, he missed three games with an injury.

In 1989, he staged an acrimonious contract holdout and lost his starting position to D.J. Dozier. On October 12, Nelson was traded to the Dallas Cowboys as part of the Herschel Walker Trade. At the time he had appeared in 5 games as a backup, registering 67 carries for 321 yards and 38 receptions for 380 yards.

San Diego Chargers
On October 17, 1989, after refusing to report to Dallas, he was traded to the San Diego Chargers in exchange for a fifth round draft choice (#116-Reggie Thornton) as part of the Herschel Walker trade. He was the third-string running back behind Marion Butts and Tim Spencer. On September 3, 1990, he was released and later re-signed. He was the fourth-string running back during that season.

Minnesota Vikings (second stint)
In 1991, he was signed as a free agent by the Minnesota Vikings. He was a backup running back behind Herschel Walker and Terry Allen and was also the team's kickoff returner for two seasons. On August 30, 1992, he was released and later re-signed. He announced his retirement on June 30, 1993.

For his career, Nelson rushed for 4,442 yards, caught 286 passes for 2,559 yards and scored 23 touchdowns (18 rushing and 5 receiving) in 152 games.

Career stats

Personal life
Nelson spent 15 years in the administration at Stanford University. In 2011, Nelson became the Senior Associate Athletic Director for the University of California Irvine.

References

1959 births
Living people
Sportspeople from Downey, California
Players of American football from California
American football running backs
Stanford Cardinal football players
Minnesota Vikings players
San Diego Chargers players
College Football Hall of Fame inductees
Ed Block Courage Award recipients